Bashkun  is a Syrian village in Sinjar Nahiyah in Maarrat al-Nu'man District, Idlib. Bashkun had a population of 111 in the 2004 Syria Central Bureau of Statistics census.

History

Bashkun was captured by ISIL in early December, 2017.

References 

Populated places in Maarat al-Numan District